The Murowa diamond mine is a diamond mine located in Mazvihwa, south central Zimbabwe, about 40 kilometres from the asbestos mining town of Zvishavane in the Midlands province. The mine is majority owned and operated by the Rio Tinto Group, which also owns the Argyle diamond mine in Australia and part of the Diavik Diamond Mine in Canada.

Geology of the Deposit
Murowa consists of three north-trending kimberlite pipes, intrusive into the Chivi suite granites of the Zimbabwe Craton. The kimberlites have been dated at 500 Ma.

History
The Murowa site's possibilities were first realized in 1997 when three diamond-bearing kimberlite pipes were discovered; over a period of three years of study, the two larger pipes have been determined to be economically feasible as mines. Construction of mine facilities was completed in late 2004. Preparation for mining included the forced relocation of 926 people living on the mine site to six farms purchased by a government relocation program. Limited mining operations began in Murowa in 2004, with full capacity expected to be reached sometime in 2005, although permitting problems have slowed progress toward this milestone. Full-scale production is expected to process 200,000 tonnes of ore annually, although it is possible to push production to as much as one million tonnes annually through further capital investment.

The mine is a combination of open pit and underground construction; current estimates put construction costs at $61 million USD. Rio Tinto estimates that over the life of the mine, prices for the Murowa's production will fetch an average price of $65 USD per carat (325 $/g).

References
Rio Tinto Diamonds: Murowa Rough Diamonds (Retrieved April 15, 2005)
"Murowa Diamond Set To Reach Full Production". The Financial Gazette: February 2, 2005.

Diamond mines in Zimbabwe
Rio Tinto (corporation) subsidiaries
Underground mines in Zimbabwe
Surface mines in Zimbabwe
Diatremes
Volcanoes of Zimbabwe
Pre-Holocene volcanoes
Buildings and structures in Midlands Province
Geography of Midlands Province